Blue Rose was an all-star all-women band that played bluegrass music.  All of the musicians in the group are solo artists in their own right who joined together to record an album as a group in 1988 for Sugar Hill Records.

 Cathy Fink: vocals, guitar, banjo, dulcimer
 Laurie Lewis: vocals, fiddle, guitar, bowed bass
 Marcy Marxer: vocals, guitar, mandolin
 Molly Mason: vocals, bass
 Sally Van Meter: vocals, Dobro, lap steel

The 1988 album's title was simply the name of the band (Blue Rose).

References

All-female bands
American bluegrass music groups